The African University Ahmed Draia of Adrar is a university, located in Adrar in the south west of Algeria. The name The African University was given to it since the beginning because its researchers and laboratories are specialized in African studies and many of its students come from various African countries, but recently, it has been added the name of the martyr Ahmed Draïa because he is a national symbol who fought in the Algerian War of Independence.

See also 
 List of universities in Algeria

References

External links
 Official website

Adrar
Buildings and structures in Adrar Province
Educational institutions established in 2001
2001 establishments in Algeria